Dalton Theatre Building is a historic theatre building located at Pulaski, Pulaski County, Virginia. It was built in 1921, and is a three-story, five bay, brick commercial building with a flat roof topped by a one-story square central tower.  At the
rear of the building was a gable-roofed auditorium and a plain five-story equipment tower serving the stage. The auditorium is designed in the Beaux Arts style.  The theater was built for vaudeville, then showed motion pictures into the 1960s. The auditorium section of the building collapsed in 1982.

It was added to the National Register of Historic Places in 1979.

References

External links

Theatres on the National Register of Historic Places in Virginia
Beaux-Arts architecture in Virginia
Theatres completed in 1921
Buildings and structures in Pulaski County, Virginia
National Register of Historic Places in Pulaski County, Virginia
1921 establishments in Virginia